Olearia trifurcata is a species of flowering plant in the family Asteraceae and is endemic to the south of Western Australia. It is a dense, upright, tussock-like subshrub with narrowly triangular, grass-like leaves, and white and pale yellow, daisy-like inflorescences.

Description
The heads or daisy-like "flowers" are arranged on the ends of branches and are sessile with a narrowly conical or oval involucre at the base.

Taxonomy 
Olearia trifurcata was first described in 2008 by Nicholas Sèan Lander in the journal Nuytsia from specimens collected by William Archer near Esperance in 1990. The specific epithet (trifurcata) means "three-forked", referring to the branching habit of the subshrub.

Distribution and habitat
This olearia grows in low shrubland on the edges of salt lakes in the Avon Wheatbelt, Coolgardie and Malle bioregions of southern Western Australia.

Conservation status
Olearia trifurculata is listed as "not threatened" by the Government of Western Australia Department of Biodiversity, Conservation and Attractions.

References

trifurcata
Endemic flora of Western Australia
Asterales of Australia
Plants described in 2008